Edim Hadžialagić (born February 8, 1962 in Sarajevo) is a former Bosnian-Herzegovinian football player.

Club career
On the club level, he played for Sarajevo, Čelik Zenica, Željezničar Sarajevo, Maribor and Olimpija Ljubljana. With the latter he won three league titles and a domestic cup and played in the 1992–93 UEFA Champions League against Italian giants AC Milan.

References

External links
PrvaLiga profile 

1962 births
Living people
Footballers from Sarajevo
Association football defenders
Yugoslav footballers
Bosnia and Herzegovina footballers
FK Sarajevo players
NK Čelik Zenica players
FK Željezničar Sarajevo players
NK Maribor players
NK Olimpija Ljubljana (1945–2005) players
Yugoslav First League players
Slovenian PrvaLiga players
Bosnia and Herzegovina expatriate footballers
Expatriate footballers in Slovenia
Bosnia and Herzegovina expatriate sportspeople in Slovenia